Oliver Anderson (born 30 April 1998) is an Australian tennis performance coach and former player. Anderson was convicted and temporarily suspended from playing professional tennis due to being found guilty of match fixing his first round match at the 2016 Latrobe City Traralgon ATP Challenger.

Anderson is best known for winning the 2016 Australian Open – Boys' singles title over Jurabek Karimov.

Tennis career 
Anderson made his professional debut at the age of 14 in March 2013 when he received a wildcard entry into an Australian futures tournament in his home state of Queensland. He would lose in the first round of both the singles and doubles tournaments. Anderson secured his first ranking point in September 2013 when he defeated Jay Andrijic in the first round of an Australian futures tournament held in Cairns. He continued to improve his ranking through 2014 and 2015 with several wins spread across the challengers tour and the futures circuit.

2016 
To begin 2016, Anderson received a qualifying wildcard into his hometown tournament – the Brisbane International. He would record two upset victories from a set down over the eighth seed Dennis Novikov and the fourth seed Tim Smyczek to qualify for his first ever ATP main draw tournament at the age of 17. He faced Croatian Ivan Dodig in the first round, losing 6–3, 6–2. Anderson was then given a wildcards into the 2016 Australian Open men's qualifying tournament and the junior boys' competition. He was lost in the second round of  qualifying tournament but went on to win the junior singles title with a three set win over Uzbekistan's Jurabek Karimov in the final. This was Anderson's first junior grand slam title.
Anderson didn't play again until May where he was eliminated in round one of qualifying for Busan and Seoul Challengers. Anderson had a further 4 months off for hip surgery returning to the ITF circuit in September. In October, Anderson was given a wildcard into the Traralgon Challenger, he lost in round 2 to John-Patrick Smith. Anderson ended the year with an ATP ranking of 736.

Match-fixing scandal 
On 5 January 2017, Anderson was charged with match-fixing his first round match at the 2016 Latrobe City Traralgon ATP Challenger in October 2016. Anderson was approached to tank the first set of his first round match against Australian Harrison Lombe. He lost the first set 4–6, but won the next two 6–0, 6–2.

In May 2017, Anderson pleaded guilty to the match-fixing charge and was fined $500 by Latrobe Valley Magistrates Court, Victoria. Anderson remains suspended (since February 2017) until the Tennis Integrity Unit investigations, and the independent Anti-Corruption Hearing process that will follow, have concluded.

On September 21, 2018, Anderson was convicted of tennis match-fixing charges. The Independent Hearing Officer ruled that 19 months provisional suspension already served by the player was full and final sanction for breaches of the Tennis Anti-Corruption Program. The disciplinary case against Anderson was adjudicated by the independent  Anti-Corruption Hearing Officer Prof Richard H. McLaren, following an investigation by the Tennis Integrity Unit.

Having found the player guilty of two breaches of the TACP, Professor McLaren ruled that the 19 months suspension that he was serving since being provisionally suspended in February 2017, would be a full and final disciplinary sanction. No further period of exclusion or fine was imposed, meaning that Anderson would be eligible to return to playing professional tennis. Anderson instead retired due to persistent injuries. He now works as a performance coach for the tennis organization Lifetime Tennis.

Junior Grand Slam titles

Singles: 1

See also
Match fixing in tennis

References

External links 
 
 
 

1998 births
Living people
Australian male tennis players
Australian Open (tennis) junior champions
Tennis players from Brisbane
Match fixers
Grand Slam (tennis) champions in boys' singles
Match fixing in tennis